Luigi Colturi (17 March 1967 – 2 June 2010) was an Italian alpine skier who competed in the 1994 Winter Olympics.

References

External links
 

1967 births
2010 deaths
Italian male alpine skiers
Olympic alpine skiers of Italy
Alpine skiers at the 1994 Winter Olympics
Alpine skiers of Centro Sportivo Carabinieri